Dickson Afoakwa (born 26 April 1998) is a Ghanaian professional footballer who plays as a forward.
He currently plays for Asante Kotoko in the Ghanaian Premier League

Career
Dickson Afoakwa was born in the second biggest Ghanaian city Kumasi and played for local club Cornerstones FC from Division One League until 2016. During summer transfer window in 2016, scouts of Dinamo Brest noticed the player and he moved to the team very soon. At the beginning, Dickson played for the reserves team, where he tried to adjust himself to local football, and after the adaptation period was over, he moved to the first squad. He left Dinamo Brest after the 2018 season.

References

External links 
 

1998 births
Living people
People from Kumasi
Ghanaian footballers
Association football forwards
Ghanaian expatriate footballers
Expatriate footballers in Belarus
Expatriate footballers in Slovenia
Expatriate soccer players in South Africa
Ghanaian expatriate sportspeople in Belarus
Ghanaian expatriate sportspeople in Slovenia
Ghanaian expatriate sportspeople in South Africa
FC Dynamo Brest players
FC Gomel players
NK Triglav Kranj players
Stellenbosch F.C. players
Belarusian Premier League players
Slovenian PrvaLiga players
South African Premier Division players
Cornerstones F.C. players
Asante Kotoko S.C. players